York Township, Illinois may refer to one of the following townships:

 York Township, Carroll County, Illinois
 York Township, Clark County, Illinois
 York Township, DuPage County, Illinois

See also 
 York Township (disambiguation)
 List of Illinois townships

Illinois township disambiguation pages